Ambassador Cruise Line is a British cruise line headquartered in Purfleet, England. The company launched and announced the purchase of its flagship Ambience in May 2021 and commenced sales to the public in the following month.

Ambience set sail for the first time on 20 April 2022, with a short cruise to Hamburg, Germany, followed by a cruise to Norway.

Ambition is scheduled to sail for the first time on 12 May 2023 from Port of Tyne to France and Spain.

Current Fleet
The following ship is operating for Ambassador Cruise Line.

Future Fleet
The following ship will operate for Ambassador Cruise Line.

References

Companies based in Essex
Cruise lines
2021 establishments in England